The Ch'ŏnghwaryŏk Line is an electrified standard-gauge freight-only secondary line of the Korean State Railway in South P'yŏngan Province, North Korea, running from Kubongsan on the Kubongsan Line to Ch'ŏnghwaryŏk.

History
The line was opened by the Korean State Railway in the 1976 to supply the Ch'ŏngch'ŏn River Thermal Power Plant with coal from the Sŏhae Line. The name of the line, and of Ch'ŏnghwaryŏk station, is derived from the name of the power plant - Ch'ŏngch'ŏngang Hwaryŏk Paljŏnso (청천강화력발전소).

Route
A yellow background in the "Distance" box indicates that section of the line is not electrified.

References

Railway lines in North Korea
Standard gauge railways in North Korea